Baptist Reinmann (31 October 1903 – 2 March 1980) was a German international footballer. He was part of Germany's team at the 1928 Summer Olympics, but he did not play in any matches.

References

1903 births
1980 deaths
Association football midfielders
German footballers
Germany international footballers
1. FC Nürnberg players
Olympic footballers of Germany
Footballers at the 1928 Summer Olympics